"Uptight" is a song by English singer and songwriter Shara Nelson, released as the fourth single from her first solo album, What Silence Knows (1993), in January 1994.

Critical reception
Jonathan Bernstein from Spin noted the song's "insecurity" in his review of the What Silence Knows album.

Track listings
 UK CD single (7243 8 81184 2 2)
 "Uptight" (Uno Perfecto Edit) - 4:30
 "Uptight" (Uno Perfecto Mix) - 7:05
 "Uptight" (Dirty Lowdown Vocal Mix) - 5:30
 "What Silence Knows" (Unreleased Version) - 7:52

 European CD single (7243 8 81186 2 0)
 "Uptight" (Uno Perfecto Edit) - 4:32
 "Uptight" (Dirty Lowdown Dub) - 5:29
 "Uptight" (Uno Perfecto Mix) - 7:06

Charts

References

External links
 

1993 songs
1994 singles
Cooltempo Records singles
Shara Nelson songs
Songs written by Attrell Cordes
Songs written by Shara Nelson